Carlos  Aguilera may refer to:
Carlos Aguilera (theater director) (1945–2009), Uruguayan theater director
Carlos Aguilera (Uruguayan footballer) (born 1964), Uruguayan footballer
Carlos Aguilera (Spanish footballer) (born 1969), Spanish footballer
Carlos Mastretta Aguilera (born 1984), Mexican race car driver